The Efficeon processor is Transmeta's second-generation 256-bit VLIW design released in 2004 which employs a software engine Code Morphing Software (CMS) to convert code written for x86 processors to the native instruction set of the chip. Like its predecessor, the Transmeta Crusoe (a 128-bit VLIW architecture), Efficeon stresses computational efficiency, low power consumption, and a low thermal footprint.

Processor
Efficeon most closely mirrors the feature set of Intel Pentium 4 processors, although, like AMD Opteron processors, it supports a fully integrated memory controller, a HyperTransport IO bus, and the NX bit, or no-execute x86 extension to PAE mode. NX bit support is available starting with CMS version 6.0.4.

Efficeon's computational performance relative to mobile CPUs like the Intel Pentium M is thought to be lower, although little appears to be published about the relative performance of these competing processors.

Efficeon came in two package types: a 783- and a 592-contact ball grid array (BGA). Its power consumption is moderate (with some consuming as little as 3 watts at 1 GHz and 7 watts at 1.5 GHz), so it can be passively cooled.

Two generations of this chip were produced. The first generation (TM8600) was manufactured using a TSMC 0.13 micrometre process and produced at speeds up to 1.2 GHz. The second generation (TM8800 and TM8820) was manufactured using a Fujitsu 90 nm process and produced at speeds ranging from 1 GHz to 1.7 GHz.

Internally, the Efficeon has two arithmetic logic units, two load/store/add units, two execute units, two floating-point/MMX/SSE/SSE2 units, one branch prediction unit, one alias unit, and one control unit. The VLIW core can execute a 256-bit VLIW instruction per cycle, which is called a molecule and has room to store eight 32-bit instructions (called atoms) per cycle.

The Efficeon has a 128 KB L1 instruction cache, a 64 KB L1 data cache and a 1 MB L2 cache. All caches are on die.

Additionally the Efficeon CMS (code morphing software) reserves a small portion of main memory (typically 32 MB) for its translation cache of dynamically translated x86 instructions.

Products

 Elitegroup A532
 Microsoft FlexGo Computer (first generation)
 Orion Multisystem Cluster Workstation
 Sharp Actius MM20, MP30, MP70G
 Sharp Mebius Muramasa PC-MM2, PC-CV50F

References

External links
Transmeta Microprocessor Technology
Efficeon TM8600 Product Sheet
Efficeon TM8300/8600 Product Brief
Efficeon TM8800 Product Sheet

Embedded microprocessors
Very long instruction word computing
X86 microprocessors
VLIW microprocessors
X86 microarchitectures